Charlotte Fitzroy, Countess of Euston (11 October 1761 – 1 February 1808), formerly Lady Charlotte Maria Waldegrave, was the wife of George FitzRoy, 4th Duke of Grafton. Although she is sometimes referred to as "Duchess of Grafton", her husband did not inherit the dukedom until 1811, after his wife's death.

Biography
She was a daughter of James Waldegrave, 2nd Earl Waldegrave, and his wife, the former Maria Walpole, the granddaughter of Robert Walpole, the first Prime Minister of Great Britain. Maria later became Duchess of Gloucester and Edinburgh through her marriage to Prince William Henry, a grandson of King George II of Great Britain. William Henry, Duke of Gloucester, became stepfather to Charlotte and her sisters in 1766, when he secretly married Maria at his house in Pall Mall. Charlotte's elder sister was Elizabeth Waldegrave, Countess Waldegrave, whose children inherited the earldom of Waldegrave. Charlotte's younger sister, Horatia, married Lord Hugh Seymour.

She married the future Duke of Grafton on 16 November 1784 at Navestock, Essex, when he was styled Earl of Euston. She was therefore known by the courtesy title Countess of Euston.

Their children were:

Lady Maria Anne Fitzroy (1785-1855), who married Sir William Oglander, 6th Baronet, and had children
Lady Elizabeth Anne (1788–1867), who married her first cousin John Henry Smyth (Smyth's mother was Lady Georgiana Fitzroy, the duke's sister), and had children
Henry FitzRoy, 5th Duke of Grafton (1790-1863)
Rt. Hon. Lt.-Col. Lord Charles Fitzroy (1791-1865), who married Lady Anne Cavendish (daughter of George Cavendish, 1st Earl of Burlington) and had children
Lady Isabella Frances FitzRoy (1792-1875)
Lord James FitzRoy (1804–1834)

Several other children died in infancy or childhood:

 Lord William FitzRoy (1794–1804)
 Lord Hugh FitzRoy (1795–1797)
 Lord Richard FitzRoy (1798–1798)
 Lord Richard FitzRoy (1800–1801)

The countess's portrait was painted by Sir Joshua Reynolds and John Hoppner, among others.

The countess died at her home in Lower Brook Street, London, aged 45, of "a liver complaint and bilious fever", and was buried in the family vault. Her obituary described her as "an example of every thing amicable in woman".

References

1761 births
1808 deaths
British courtesy countesses
Daughters of British earls